In modern musical notation and tuning, an enharmonic equivalent is a note, interval, or key signature that is equivalent to some other note, interval, or key signature but "spelled", or named differently. The enharmonic spelling of a written note, interval, or chord is an alternative way to write that note, interval, or chord. The term is derived from Latin enharmonicus, from Late Latin enarmonius, from Ancient Greek ἐναρμόνιος (enarmónios), from ἐν (en) and ἁρμονία (harmonía).

Definition
For example, in any twelve-tone equal temperament (the predominant system of musical tuning in Western music), the notes C and D are enharmonic (or enharmonically equivalent) notes. Namely, they are the same key on a keyboard, and thus they are identical in pitch, although they have different names and different roles in harmony and chord progressions. Arbitrary amounts of accidentals can produce further enharmonic equivalents, such as B (meaning B-double sharp), although these are much rarer and have less practical use.

In other words, if two notes have the same pitch but have different letter names, we call them enharmonic. "Enharmonic intervals are intervals with the same sound that are spelled differently… [resulting], of course, from enharmonic tones."

Prior to this modern meaning, "enharmonic" referred to notes that were very close in pitch—closer than the smallest step of a diatonic scale—but not identical in pitch.  One such example is G, which is not the same note and sound as A in many temperaments of more than twelve tones, as in an enharmonic scale. "Enharmonic equivalence is peculiar to post-tonal theory." "Much music since at least the 18th century, however, exploits enharmonic equivalence for purposes of modulation and this requires that enharmonic equivalents in fact be equivalent."

Some key signatures have an enharmonic equivalent that represents a scale identical in sound but spelled differently. The number of sharps and flats of two enharmonically equivalent keys sum to twelve. For example, the key of B major, with five sharps, is enharmonically equivalent to the key of C major with seven flats, so that gives five (sharps) + seven (flats) = 12. Keys past seven sharps or seven flats  exist only theoretically and not in practice. The enharmonic keys are six pairs, three major pairs and three minor pairs: B major/C major, G minor/A minor, F major/G major, D minor/E minor, C major/D major and A minor/B minor. There are practically no works composed in keys that require double sharps or double flats in the key signature. In practice, musicians learn and practice 15 major and 15 minor keys, three more than 12 due to the enharmonic spellings.

Enharmonic equivalents can also be used to improve the readability of a line of music. For example, a sequence of notes is more easily read as "ascending" or "descending" if the noteheads are on different positions on the staff. Doing so may also reduce the number of accidentals that must be used. Thus, in the key of B major, the sequence B-B-B is more easily read using the enharmonic spelling C instead of B.

For example, the intervals of a minor sixth on C, on B, and an augmented fifth on C are all enharmonic intervals . The most common enharmonic intervals are the augmented fourth and diminished fifth, or tritone, for example C–F = C–G.

Enharmonic equivalence is not to be confused with octave equivalence, nor are enharmonic intervals to be confused with inverted or compound intervals.

Examples in practice
An example in popular music occurs in melody line of Jerome Kern's song “All the things you are”, where the note G sharp that concludes the bridge section repeats, over changing harmony, as an A flat, the first note of the returning “A” section.

Beethoven's Piano Sonata in E Minor, Op. 90, contains a passage where the lowest note, B-flat, becomes an A-sharp, altering its musical meaning and significance.  The first two bars of the following passage unfold a simple descending scale of B-flat major.  However, according to Wilfrid Mellers, the B-flats here "turn out to be a pun, for they change enharmonically into A-sharps, part of a dominant ninth leading to B minor."

Chopin's Prelude No. 15, known as the "Raindrop Prelude", features a pedal point on the note A-flat throughout its opening section.

"The repeated A-flats ... become enharmonically changed into G-sharps in the middle section of this Prelude, and take on a brooding, ominous character."

One of the most spectacular enharmonic changes in all music occurs in the concluding passage of the slow movement of one of Schubert's last sonatas, his final piano sonata, in B-flat, D960.  Here, in bars 102-3, the note B-sharp transforms into C natural as part of a progression, where the chord of G sharp, the dominant chord of C sharp minor, "melts with breathtaking effect into a C major chord."

Tuning enharmonics
In principle, the modern musical use of the word enharmonic to mean identical tones is correct only in equal temperament, where the octave is divided into 12 equal semitones.  In other tuning systems, however, enharmonic associations can be perceived by listeners and exploited by composers.

Pythagorean

In Pythagorean tuning, all pitches are generated from a series of justly tuned perfect fifths, each with a frequency ratio of 3 to 2. If the first note in the series is an A, the thirteenth note in the series, G is higher than the seventh octave (octave = ratio of 1 to 2, seven octaves is 1 to 27 = 128) of the A by a small interval called a Pythagorean comma. This interval is expressed mathematically as:

Meantone

In quarter-comma meantone, on the other hand, consider G and A. Call middle C's frequency x. Then high C has a frequency of 2x. The quarter-comma meantone has just (i.e., perfectly-tuned) major thirds, which means major thirds with a frequency ratio of exactly 4 to 5.

To form a just major third with the C above it, A and high C must be in the ratio 4 to 5, so A needs to have the frequency

To form a just major third above E, however, G needs to form the ratio 5 to 4 with E, which, in turn, needs to form the ratio 5 to 4 with C. Thus the frequency of G is 

Thus, G and A are not the same note; G is, in fact 41 cents lower in pitch (41% of a semitone, not quite a quarter of a tone). On a piano tuned in equal temperament, both G and A are played by striking the same key, so both have a frequency

Such small differences in pitch can escape notice when presented as melodic intervals. However, when they are sounded as chords, the difference between meantone intonation and equal-tempered intonation can be quite noticeable, even to untrained ears.

One can label enharmonically equivalent pitches with one and only one name; for instance, the numbers of integer notation, as used in serialism and musical set theory and employed by the MIDI interface.

Enharmonic genus

In ancient Greek music the enharmonic was one of the three Greek genera in music in which the tetrachords are divided (descending) as a ditone plus two microtones. Some examples of enharmonic genera are

See also
 Enharmonic keyboard
 Music theory
 Transpositional equivalence
 Diatonic and chromatic
 Enharmonic modulation

References

Further reading
 Eijk, Lisette D. van der (2020). "The difference between a sharp and a flat".

External links
 
 

Intervals (music)
Musical notes